Cysteodemus armatus, the inflated blister beetle, is a species of blister beetle in the family Meloidae. It is found in Central America and North America. The wing covers, which are mostly glabrous, are inflated to the point of almost covering part of the thorax. They are black, densely spotted with white. The elytra are fused along the middle, meaning that the beetle cannot fly.

References

Further reading

External links

 

Meloidae
Articles created by Qbugbot
Beetles described in 1851